The 2016 United States House of Representatives elections in Illinois were held on November 8, 2016, to elect the 18 U.S. representatives from the state of Illinois, one from each of the state's 18 congressional districts. The elections coincided with the 2016 U.S. presidential election, as well as other elections to the House of Representatives, elections to the United States Senate and various state and local elections.

The filing deadline for candidates for major parties was November 30, 2015.  The candidates listed below were the official filed candidates for the party primaries for each district, per the Illinois State Board of Elections. Objections to a candidate's nomination papers needed to be filed by December 7, 2015. The primaries were held on March 15.

District 1

The incumbent was Democrat Bobby Rush, who had represented the district since 1993. He was re-elected with 73% of the vote in 2014. The district had a PVI of D+28.

Democratic primary
On November 12, 2015, Chicago Alderman Howard Brookins Jr. was reported to be circulating petitions to run for Congress, leading to speculation that  Rush might retire. Brookins had previously circulated petitions in 2013, but declined to run at that time when Rush announced for re-election. Brookins announced that this time he would run for the seat, regardless of Rush's decision. In November 2015, Rush announced that he would run for re-election.
  
Former Cure Violence director and 2014 gubernatorial candidate Tio Hardiman had announced he would challenge Rush for the Democratic nomination. Hardiman withdrew in order to run for Cook County Clerk of Court.

Candidates
Declared
 Howard Brookins, Chicago Alderman
 Patrick Brutus, economic development consultant and candidate for IL-02 in 2013
 Bobby Rush, incumbent U.S. Representative

Removed
 Harold Bailey, City Parks District employee and candidate for this seat in 2010 and 2012

Endorsements

Primary results

Republican primary

Candidates
 August Deuser
 Jimmy Lee Tillman

Primary results

General election

Results

District 2

The incumbent was Democrat Robin Kelly, who had represented the district since 2013. She was re-elected with 78% of the vote in 2014.  The district had a PVI of D+29.

Kelly considered running for the U.S. Senate, but decided to run for re-election instead.

Democratic primary

Candidates
 Robin Kelly, incumbent U.S. Representative
 Marcus Lewis, postal worker, independent candidate in 2012 and 2013 and Democratic candidate in 2014
 Dorian Myrickes
 Charles Rayburn, candidate in 2013 and 2014

Endorsements

Primary results

Republican primary

Candidates
 John Morrow

Primary results

General election

Results

District 3

The incumbent was Democrat Dan Lipinski, who had represented the district since 2005. He was re-elected with 65% of the vote in 2014.  The district had a PVI of D+5.

Democratic primary
Incumbent Dan Lipinski ran unopposed for the Democratic nomination.  Oren Jacobson, a tech entrepreneur, had formed an exploratory committee in May 2015 to consider a primary challenge of Lipinski. Jacobson terminated the committee in July 2015.

Candidates
 Dan Lipinski, incumbent U.S. Representative

Primary results

Republican primary

Candidates
Removed
 Art Jones

General election

Results

District 4

The incumbent was Democrat Luis Gutiérrez, who had represented the district since 1993. He was re-elected with 78% of the vote in 2014.  The district had a PVI of D+29.

Democratic primary
Javier Salas, a former journalist and former senior policy adviser to Governor Pat Quinn, challenged Gutiérrez for the Democratic nomination. Salas cited Gutiérrez's support for Mayor Rahm Emanuel over challenger Chuy Garcia in the 2015 Chicago mayoral election as a reason for his primary challenge.

Candidates
 Luis Gutiérrez, incumbent U.S. Representative
 Javier Salas, former journalist, radio host and senior policy adviser to Governor Pat Quinn

Endorsements

Primary results

Republican primary
No candidates filed for the Republican primary for this seat.

General election

Results

District 5

The incumbent was Democrat Mike Quigley, who had represented the district since 2009. He was re-elected with 63% of the vote in 2014.  The district had a PVI of D+16.

Democratic primary
Congressman Mike Quigley ran unopposed for the Democratic nomination.

Primary results

Republican primary
No candidates filed for the Republican primary for this seat.

Green primary

Candidates
 Warren "Grizz" Grimsley
 Rob Sherman, atheist activist, businessman, and perennial candidate

Removed from ballot
Richard Mayers

Endorsements

Primary results

General election

Results

District 6

The incumbent was Republican Peter Roskam, who had represented the district since 2007. He was re-elected with 67% of the vote in 2014. The district had a PVI of R+4. Glen Ellyn Park District commissioner Jay Kinzler opposed Roskam in the primary. Kinzler ran to the political right of Roskam.

Republican primary

Candidates
Declared
 Gordon "Jay" Kinzler,  Glen Ellyn Park District commissioner
 Peter Roskam, incumbent U.S. Representative

Withdrawn
 Gerald "Jerry" Drabik

Endorsements

Primary results

Democratic primary

Candidates
 Amanda Howland, College of Lake County Trustee and 2012 State Senate candidate
 Robert Marshall, radiologist and perennial candidate

Endorsements

Primary results

General election

Results

District 7

The incumbent was Democrat Danny K. Davis, who had represented the district since 1997. He was re-elected with 85% of the vote in 2014.  The district had a PVI of D+36.

Democratic primary

Candidates
Declared
 Danny K. Davis, incumbent U.S. Representative
 Thomas Day

Removed
 Frederick Collins

Endorsements

Primary results

Republican primary
No candidates filed for the Republican primary for this seat.

General election

Results

District 8

The incumbent was Democrat Tammy Duckworth, who had represented the district since 2013, and who retired so she could run for the United States Senate in 2016 against Republican incumbent Mark Kirk. She was re-elected with 56% of the vote in 2014. The district had a PVI of D+8.

Democrats Raja Krishnamoorthi, a past candidate for the district, and State Senator Mike Noland declared they would run for the district. Krishnamoorthi was endorsed by Representative Jan Schakowsky.

Democratic primary

Candidates
Declared
 Deb Bullwinkel, Mayor of Villa Park
 Raja Krishnamoorthi, former deputy state treasurer, candidate for this seat in 2012, and candidate for Comptroller in 2010
 Michael Noland, state senator

Withdrawn
 Tom Cullerton, state senator (running for re-election)

Declined
 Jenny Burke, legal analyst, Itasca School Board member and 2014 State House Candidate
 Tammy Duckworth, incumbent U.S. Representative (running for the U.S. Senate)

Endorsements

Primary results

Republican primary

Candidates
Declared
 Pete DiCianni, DuPage County Commissioner and former mayor of Elmhurst

Removed
 Richard Evans
 Joseph Hantsch
 Andrew Straw, disability rights attorney and Green candidate for Indiana's 2nd congressional district in 2012

Declined
 Larry Kaifesh, retired United States Marine Corps Colonel and nominee for this seat in 2014
 David McSweeney, state representative
 Darlene Ruscitti, DuPage County Superintendent of Education
 Tim Schneider, Cook County Commissioner and chairman of the Illinois Republican Party

Endorsements

Primary results

General election

Results

District 9

The incumbent was Democrat Jan Schakowsky, who had represented the district since 1999. She was re-elected with 66% of the vote in 2014. The district had a PVI of D+15.

Democratic primary
Jan Schakowsky ran unopposed in the Democratic primary.

Primary results

Republican primary
Joan McCarthy Lasonde of Wilmette filed for the Republican nomination on November 23, 2015. She was the only Republican on the ballot in the primary election.

Primary results

General election

Endorsements

General election

Results

District 10

The incumbent was Republican Bob Dold, who had represented the district since 2015 and previously from 2011 to 2013. He was elected with 51% of the vote in 2014, defeating Democratic incumbent Brad Schneider. The district had a PVI of D+8, which made the 10th congressional district the most Democratic district in the country represented by a Republican. As such, Dold was a top Democratic target.

Republican primary
Incumbent Bob Dold ran unopposed in the Republican primary.

Candidates
 Bob Dold, incumbent U.S. Representative

Endorsements

Primary results

Democratic primary
Schneider announced on April 2, 2015, that he would again run for the 10th district against Dold.

Candidates
Nancy Rotering, Mayor of Highland Park, Illinois
Brad Schneider, former U.S. Representative

Endorsements

Primary results

General election

Polling

Results

District 11

The incumbent was Democrat Bill Foster, who had represented the district since 2013 and previously represented the 14th district from 2008 to 2011. He was re-elected with 53% of the vote in 2014.  The district had a PVI of D+8.

Foster considered running for the U.S. Senate, but decided to run for re-election instead.

Democratic primary
Incumbent Bill Foster ran unopposed in the Democratic primary.

Primary results

Republican primary
DuPage County board member Tonia Khouri, cardiologist Dominick Stella, and scientist Herman White ran for the Republican nomination.

Candidates
 Tonia Khouri
 Nick Stella
 Herman White

Endorsements

Primary results

General election

Results

District 12

The incumbent was Republican Mike Bost, who had represented the district since 2015. He was elected with 52% of the vote in 2014, defeating Democratic incumbent William Enyart. The district had an even PVI.

Republican primary
Congressman Mike Bost ran unopposed in the Republican primary.

Primary results

Democratic primary
Attorney C.J. Baricevic won the Democratic nomination. Prior to the Democratic primary, international aid worker Edward Vowell had formed an exploratory committee. Other potential Democratic candidates included State Representative Jerry Costello II, State Representative Jay Hoffman and St. Clair County State's Attorney Brendan Kelly, and former Lieutenant Governor Sheila Simon.

FEC complaint
On June 28, 2016, the Foundation for Accountability and Civic Trust (FACT) filed a complaint with the Federal Elections Commission with allegations of election illegality.

Candidates
Declared
 C.J. Baricevic, attorney

Declined
 Jerry Costello II, state representative
 Jay Hoffman, state representative
 Brendan Kelly, St. Clair County State's Attorney
 Sheila Simon, former Lieutenant Governor and nominee for Comptroller in 2014
 Edward Vowell, international aid worker
 Rick Watson, St. Clair County Sheriff

Primary results

Green primary

Candidates
 Paula Bradshaw
 Sadona Folkner

Primary results

General election
Bost defeated Baricevic and Bradshaw in the general election on November 8, 2016, winning 54% of the vote.

Results

District 13

The incumbent was Republican Rodney L. Davis, who had represented the district since 2013. He was re-elected with 59% of the vote in 2014. The district had an even PVI. Davis ran for re-election.

Republican primary
Pharmacist Ethan Vandersand filed to challenge Congressman Rodney Davis for the Republican nomination.

Candidates
 Rodney Davis, incumbent U.S. Representative
 Ethan Vandersand, pharmacist

Endorsements

Primary results

Democratic primary
Mark Wicklund ran unopposed in the Democratic primary.

Candidates
Declared
 Mark Wicklund, president of the Decatur-Macon County Opportunities Corporation and former Macon County Board member

Declined
 Tom Banning, Assistant Illinois Attorney General
 Tony DelGiorno, Sangamon County Board Member
 David Gill, physician and nominee in 2004, 2006, 2010, and 2012 (running as Independent)
 Andy Manar, state senator
 Julia Rietz, Champaign County State's Attorney

Primary results

Independents
Physician David Gill, the Democratic nominee for this district in 2004, 2006, 2010, and 2012 announced that he would make a fifth run, but as an independent this time.  In order to qualify for the general election ballot, Gill needed to file nomination papers by June 27, 2016.

General election

Results

District 14

The incumbent was Republican Randy Hultgren, who had represented the district since 2011. He was re-elected with 65% of the vote in 2014.  The district had a PVI of R+5.

Republican primary
Joe Walsh, former Republican representative for Illinois's 8th congressional district from 2011 to 2013 and radio talk show host on 560 AM considered a primary bid against Hultgren.  Walsh did not file to run, leaving Hultgren unopposed for the Republican nomination.

Primary results

Democratic primary

Candidates
 John Hosta
 Jesse Maggitt
 Jim Walz

Endorsements

Primary results

General election

Results

District 15

The incumbent was Republican John Shimkus, who had represented the district since 2013 and previously represented the 19th district from 2003 to 2013 and the 20th district from 1997 to 2003.  He was re-elected with 74% of the vote in 2014. The district had a PVI of R+14. Shimkus ran for re-election.

Republican primary
State Senator Kyle McCarter unsuccessfully challenged Shimkus for the Republican nomination. McCarter ran to the right of Shimkus.

Candidates
 Kyle McCarter, state senator
 John Shimkus, incumbent U.S. Representative

Endorsements

Primary results

Democratic primary
No candidates filed for the Democratic primary for this seat.

General election

Results

District 16

The incumbent was Republican Adam Kinzinger, who had represented the district since 2013 and previously represented the 11th district from 2011 to 2013.  He was re-elected with 71% of the vote in 2014.  The district had a PVI of R+4.

Republican primary
Congressman Adam Kinzinger was considered a possible candidate for the U.S. Senate if Republican senator Mark Kirk had decided not to run again.  However, Senator Kirk ended up filing for re-election and Kinzinger remained running for re-election.

Colin McGroarty announced on July 16, 2015, at a meeting of the Northern Illinois Tea Party that he would challenge Kinzinger for the Republican nomination.

Candidates
Declared
 Adam Kinzinger, incumbent U.S. Representative

Removed
 Colin McGroarty, technology consultant and Tea Party activist

Primary results

Democratic primary
No candidates filed for the Democratic primary for this seat.

General election

Results

District 17

The incumbent was Democrat Cheri Bustos, who had represented the district since 2013. She was re-elected with 55% of the vote in 2014.  The district had a PVI of D+7.

Bustos considered running for the U.S. Senate, but decided to run for re-election instead.

Democratic primary
Incumbent Cheri Bustos ran unopposed in the Democratic primary.

Primary results

Republican primary
Patrick Harlan, a fuel truck driver and president of the Knox County Tea Party, announced in September that he was running for the Republican nomination. Jack Boccarossa, owner of a Christmas tree farm, also filed for the Republican primary.

Candidates
 Jack Boccarossa, retired engineer and tree farm owner
 Patrick Harlan, fuel truck driver and president of the Knox County Tea Party

Endorsements

Primary results

General election

Results

District 18

The incumbent was Republican Darin LaHood, who had represented the district since 2015. He was elected with 69% of the vote in the September 10, 2015 special election to fill the remainder of the term of former Congressman Aaron Schock.  Aaron Schock, who had represented the district since 2009 resigned March 31, 2015 due to controversy over his spending.  The district had a PVI of R+11.

Republican primary
Mark Zalcman, a Normal, Illinois attorney, planned to challenge Schock in the Republican primary election in March 2016. Zalcman promoted a platform based on his Christian Gospel-centered faith and values. Zalcman declined to run in the special election due to a shortened period to obtain the necessary signatures to qualify for the ballot.  Zalcman announced that he would focus on the 2016 primary instead.  Zalcman did not file for this seat, leaving LaHood unopposed for the Republican nomination.

Candidates
 Darin LaHood, incumbent U.S. Representative

Primary results

Democratic primary
No candidates filed for the Democratic primary for this seat.

Write-In
Darrel Miller

Primary results

General election

Results

References

External links
U.S. House elections in Illinois, 2016 at Ballotpedia
Campaign contributions at OpenSecrets

House
Illinois
2016